is a Japanese actress, singer, and former member of the Japanese idol group AKB48. Her supposed apathetic attitude toward idol fans led to the popularity of the buzzword  in Japanese media. Since graduating from AKB48 in 2016, Shimazaki has worked as an actress, including roles in Hiyokko, Nisekoi, and Tonde Saitama. She also started her own YouTube channel on March 30, 2020.

Career 
Haruka Shimazaki was born in Saitama Prefecture, and began her entertainment career in 2009 by successfully auditioning for AKB48 in the 6th Kenkyūsei Audition (9th generation AKB48 audition). Her official nickname, Paruru, was coined by then fellow member Rumi Yonezawa. In the AKB48 17th single senbatsu election, which took place from May to June 2010, Shimazaki ranked 28th, the highest of all trainees. In June 2011 it was announced that she would be promoted to a newly created Team 4. In the AKB48 27th single senbatsu election, which took place from May to June 2012, Shimazaki ranked 23rd. In August 2012 she was transferred to Team B after Team 4 was disbanded. In September 2012 she won the 3rd AKB48 rock-paper-scissors tournament, held in Nippon Budokan, earning the center position in AKB48's single "Eien Pressure," which was released on December 5, 2012.

In 2012, Shimazaki appeared in the movie Gekijōban Shiritsu Bakaleya Kōkō, which was based on the 2012 TV series Shiritsu Bakaleya Kōkō. Later the same year she appeared together with Minami Takahashi in an automated external defibrillator (AED) training session, sponsored by the Japanese Red Cross. On February 23, 2013, she appeared on the cover of the April issue of the Japanese fashion magazine Smart. In 2014, Shimazaki appeared in a recruiting commercial for the Japan Self-Defense Forces. Later that year, the phrase , which referred to her supposed apathetic attitude toward her fans during meet-and-greet events, was again included as one of the Top 50 Japanese Buzzwords for the year.

On October 3, 2016, during a promotional appearance for the brand Baitoru, Shimazaki announced her graduation from AKB48. For the group's 46th single "High Tension", released on November 16, 2016, Shimazaki served as the choreographic center in her final appearance on an AKB48 single. She attended the 67th NHK Kōhaku Uta Gassen and graduated from AKB48 on December 31, 2016. Since graduating from AKB48, Shimazaki has pursued an acting career, playing a supporting role in the 96th NHK asadora Hiyokko, appearing alongside veteran actor Kōji Yakusho in a series of television commercials for the national Jumbo Lottery, and playing the role of Marika Tachibana in Nisekoi, the 2018 film adaptation of the manga by Naoshi Komi.

On her 26th birthday on March 30, 2020, Shimazaki launched her official YouTube channel, called . It releases a new video every day at 7:00 pm JST. The channel reached 100,000 subscribers on May 2 and has featured other former AKB48 members such as Mariya Nagao and Tomomi Itano. The channel's opening jingle was created by singer-songwriter .

On July 18, Shimazaki revealed that she has become an independent talent.

Personal life 
Shimazaki has a younger brother. When they were children, both of their parents worked and their grandmother often took care of them. Before she entered the entertainment industry, Shimazaki had aspired to become a veterinarian.

Discography

Singles with AKB48

Albums 
 Koko ni Ita Koto
 "High School Days" (Team Kenkyūsei)
 "Koko ni Ita Koto" (AKB48+SKE48+SDN48+NMB48)
 1830m
 "First Rabbit"
 "Chokkaku Sunshine" (Team 4)
 "Itsuka Mita Umi no Soko" (Up-and-coming Girls)
 "Yasashisa no Chizu"
 "Aozora yo Sabishikunai Ka?" (AKB48 + SKE48 + NMB48 + HKT48)
 Tsugi no Ashiato
 "After Rain"
 "Boy Hunt no Houhou Oshiemasu"
 "Boku wa Ganbaru"
 "Ponkotsu Blues"
 "Dōki"
 "Kanashiki Kinkyori Renai"
 Koko ga Rhodes da, Koko de Tobe!
 "Ai no Sonzai"
 "Oh! Baby!" (Takahashi Team A)
 "Tomodachi de Irareru Nara"
 0 to 1 no Aida
 "Toy Poodle to Kimi no Monogatari" 
 "Clap" (Team A)
 Thumbnail
 "Ano Hi no Jibun"

AKB48 theater acts 
Team Kenkyūsei "Idol no Yoake"
 
Team B 4th Stage "Idol no Yoake"
 "Kataomoi no Taikakusen"
 substitute for Moeno Nitō
Team Kenkyūsei "Renai Kinshi Jōrei"
 
Team A 5th Stage "Renai Kinshi Jōrei"
   (dancer)
  (dancer)
 "Tsundere!"
 substitute for Tomomi Itano
Team Kenkyūsei "Theater no Megami"
 
Team B 5th Stage "Theater no Megami"
  (as part of zenza girls, i.e. the opening number performed by trainees)
 "Candy"
 substitute for Amina Satō
Team A 6th Stage "Mokugekisha"
  (zenza girls)
 
 substitute for Sayaka Nakaya
Team K 6th Stage "Reset"
  (zenza girls)
 
 substitute for Tomomi Nakatsuka
Team 4 1st Stage "Boku no Taiyō"
 
Team B Waiting Stage
 
Team A Renai Kinshi Jōrei
 
Team A 7th Stage "M.T. ni Sasagu"

Appearances

Films 
 Gekijōban Shiritsu Bakaleya Kōkō (October 13, 2012), Fumie Shingyōji
 Ataru The First Love & The Last Kill (September 14, 2013), Rumi Mizuno
 Ghost Theater (November 21, 2015), Sara Mizuki
 Haunted Campus (2016), Koyomi Nada
 Nisekoi (2018), Marika Tachibana
 Fly Me to the Saitama (2019)
 Nagi's Island (2022)
 The Fish Tale (2022)

Dubbing
 Yo-Kai Watch: Tanjō no Himitsu da Nyan! (December 20, 2014), Yukippe

 TV dramas 
 Majisuka Gakuen (final episode, March 26, 2010, TV Tokyo)
 Majisuka Gakuen 2 (April 15 — July 1, 2011, TV Tokyo), Kanburi
 Shiritsu Bakaleya Kōkō (April 14 — June 30, 2012, NTV), Fumie Shingyōji
 Majisuka Gakuen 3 (July 13 — October 5, 2012, TV Tokyo), Paru
  (January 6, 2013, TBS)
 So long! (2013, NTV), Asuka Hashimoto
 Fortune Cookie (2013, Fuji TV), Michiko Shintani
 Honto ni Atta Kowai Hanashi 15-shunen Special "Sasoi no Mori" (2014, Fuji TV), Aoi Sumida
 Majisuka Gakuen 4 (January 19 — March 30, 2015, Nippon Television), as Salt
 Majisuka Gakuen 5 (August 24 — October 27, 2015, Nippon Television, Hulu) as Salt
 AKB Horror Night: Adrenaline's Night Ep.24 - Music Box, as Mariko (2015)
 Yutori Desuga Nanika (2016, NTV), as Yutori Sakama
 AKB Love Night: Love Factory Ep.33 - Marriage Reason, as Haruko (2016, TV Asahi)
  (2016, TV Asahi) as Kyoko Kazahaya
 Kyabasuka Gakuen (2016, NTV) as Salt
 Hiyokko (2017, NHK) as Yuka Makino
  (2018, NTV) as Yuko Machida
  episode 4, as Rena Mineshima (2018, TV Asahi)
 Harem Marriage (2022, ABC) as Koharu Date
 DCU Ep. 8 (2022, TBS) as Akemi Totsuka

 TV variety shows 
 Ariyoshi AKB Kyōwakoku (March 29, 2010 — March 28, 2016, TBS)
  (August 13, 2010, TV Tokyo)
 AKBingo! (December 22, 2010 — present, TV Tokyo)
  (Family Gekijō)
  (July 17, 2011)
 Season 7
 Season 8
 Atsushi Paruru no OO baito! (2015 — 2016)

Bibliography

Magazines
 Myojo, Shueisha
 SEDA, Hinode Publishing

Photobooks
 Paruru, Komaru. (July 19, 2013, Shueisha) 
 ParU'' (November 20, 2015, Shufu to Seikatsu Sha)

References

External links 
 

1994 births
Living people
Actors from Saitama Prefecture
AKB48 members
Japanese idols
Japanese film actresses
Japanese television actresses
Sony Music Entertainment Japan artists
Musicians from Saitama Prefecture
21st-century Japanese women singers
21st-century Japanese singers
21st-century Japanese actresses
Japanese YouTubers